Orthotrichum striatum is a species of moss belonging to the family Orthotrichaceae.

It has cosmopolitan distribution.

References

Orthotrichales